David Young was a Scottish athlete who competed as a discus thrower.

Young, a Glasgow police officer by profession, was a member of a Harriers club in Shettleston.

Self coached, Young won his first Scottish Championship for discus in 1937 and the following year claimed a silver medal at the British Empire Games in Sydney, which was Scotland's only medal of the athletics competition.

Young set a British record of 153.8 ft in winning the Scottish Championships again in 1938.

The war and personal tragedy limited Young's sporting career. He had to raise five children on his own after his first two wives both died young. After the war, he became an inspector in the traffic department of the police force.

References

Year of birth missing (living people)
1983 deaths
British male discus throwers
Scottish male discus throwers
Athletes (track and field) at the 1938 British Empire Games
Commonwealth Games silver medallists for Scotland
Commonwealth Games medallists in athletics
Medallists at the 1938 British Empire Games
Sportspeople from Glasgow